Cornelius Carr (born John Thomas Carr; 9 April 1969) is an English former professional boxer. He challenged once for the WBO world super middleweight title in 1995.

Early life

At the age of nine he survived meningitis after 3 weeks of intensive care. He recovered to make first encounter with boxing aged 11 years at the Grangetown Amateur Boxing club in Middlesbrough, run by Martin Turner.

As a 17-year-old amateur he reached the 1987 Amateur Boxing Association of England National Championship final at Wembley Arena, London and fought Rod Douglas, an Olympic medalist and England squad member.

Professional boxing career

British Super-Middleweight Champion

With only 1 defeat in 24 professional bouts, Carr won the BBBofC British Super-Middleweight in 1994 by beating James Cook on points at York Hall in London.

WBO Super Middleweight title fight

At short notice Carr was given the opportunity to challenge Steve Collins for the WBO Super Middleweight Title at The Point, Dublin, Ireland in November 1995. After 12 rounds he lost on points.

World Boxing Federation (WBF) World Middleweight Champion

In February 1999, Carr became the World Boxing Federation (WBF) World Middleweight Champion, defeating Steve Foster by a unanimous decision.  He successfully defended this title in the following October beating Dingaan Thobela.

Cornelius Carr retired in 2001 with a record of: 34 Wins (17 KOs), 4 Losses.

After professional career

Carr now resides in Bournemouth, England, working as a boxing coach and online mentor through the website Sneak Punch.

In June 2012, Chris Eubank hinted in the national press about a possible return to the ring. Carr issued a press release to the media attempting to drum up interest for a contest, although later admitted nothing had materialised.

Carr is featured in the video for the single "Boxers" by Morrissey, released in January 1995, and appears on the cover artwork for the 1995 Morrissey compilation album World of Morrissey as well as an earlier single by The Smiths, called Sweet and Tender Hooligan.

Professional boxing record 

|-
| style="text-align:center;" colspan="6"|34 Wins (17 KOs), 4 Losses
|- style="text-align:left; background:#e3e3e3;"
| style="border-style:none none solid solid; "|Res.
| style="border-style:none none solid solid; "|Opponent
| style="border-style:none none solid solid; "|Type
| style="border-style:none none solid solid; "|Date
| style="border-style:none none solid solid; "|Location
| style="border-style:none none solid solid; "|Notes
|- align=center
|Loss||align=left| Sam Soliman
|
|
|align=left|
|- align=center
|Won||align=left| Gary Beardsley
|
|
|align=left|
|- align=center
|Won||align=left| Dingaan Thobela
|
|
|align=left|
|
|- align=center
|Won||align=left| Jason Barker
|
|
|align=left|
|- align=center
|Won||align=left| Steve Foster
|
|
|align=left|
|
|- align=center
|Won||align=left| Jimmy Vincent
|
|
|align=left|
|- align=center
|Won||align=left| Danny Juma
|
|
|align=left|
|- align=center
|Won||align=left| Darren Covill
|
|
|align=left|
|- align=center
|Loss||align=left| Dean Francis
|
|
|align=left|
|- align=center
|Won||align=left| Danny Juma
|
|
|align=left|
|- align=center
|Loss||align=left| Steve Collins
|
|
|align=left|
|
|- align=center
|Won||align=left| Barry Thorogood
|
|
|align=left|
|- align=center
|Won||align=left| Chris Richards
|
|
|align=left|
|- align=center
|Won||align=left| Colin Manners
|
|
|align=left|
|- align=center
|Won||align=left| James Cook
|
|
|align=left|
|
|- align=center
|Won||align=left| Horace Fleary
|
|
|align=left|
|- align=center
|Won||align=left| Stan King
|
|
|align=left|
|- align=center
|Won||align=left| Graham Burton
|
|
|align=left|
|- align=center
|Won||align=left| Alan Richards
|
|
|align=left|
|- align=center
|Won||align=left| Marvin O'Brien
|
|
|align=left|
|- align=center
|Won||align=left| Paul Burton
|
|
|align=left|
|- align=center
|Won||align=left| Carlo Colarusso
|
|
|align=left|
|- align=center
|Won||align=left| Frank Eubank
|
|
|align=left|
|- align=center
|Won||align=left| Jerry Nestor
|
|
|align=left|
|- align=center
|Won||align=left| John Maltreaux
|
|
|align=left|
|- align=center
|Won||align=left| Franky Moro
|
|
|align=left|
|- align=center
|Won||align=left| Peter Gorny
|
|
|align=left|
|- align=center
|Won||align=left| Carlo Colarusso
|
|
|align=left|
|- align=center
|Loss||align=left| Georges Bosco
|
|
|align=left|
|- align=center
|Won||align=left| Kevin Hayde
|
|
|align=left|
|- align=center
|Won||align=left| Skip Jackson
|
|
|align=left|
|- align=center
|Won||align=left| Andy Catesby
|
|
|align=left|
|- align=center
|Won||align=left| Franky Moro
|
|
|align=left|
|- align=center
|Won||align=left| Darren Parker
|
|
|align=left|
|- align=center
|Won||align=left| Kesem Clayton
|
|
|align=left|
|- align=center
|Won||align=left| Seamus Casey
|
|
|align=left|
|
|- align=center
|Won||align=left| Dave Heaver
|
|
|align=left|
|- align=center
|Won||align=left| Paul Burton
|
|
|align=left|
|

|-

References

External links
Official website

1969 births
Living people
Sportspeople from Middlesbrough
Super-middleweight boxers
English male boxers